Dominic A. Fucci (September 15, 1928 – June 22, 1987) was an American football defensive back in the National Football League for the Detroit Lions.  He played college football at the University of Kentucky and was drafted in the eighteenth round of the 1951 NFL Draft by the Washington Redskins.

1928 births
1987 deaths
Sportspeople from Warren County, New Jersey
Players of American football from New Jersey
American football defensive backs
Kentucky Wildcats football players
Detroit Lions players